Holovousy is a municipality and village in Jičín District in the Hradec Králové Region of the Czech Republic. It has about 500 inhabitants.

Administrative parts
Villages and hamlets of Chloumky, Chodovice and Dolní Mezihoří are administrative parts of Holovousy.

References

Villages in Jičín District